Dor Hugi (born ) is an Israeli professional footballer who plays for Israeli Premier League club Bnei Sakhnin on loan from Wisła Kraków.

Early life
Hugi was born in Bnei Brak, Israel, to a family of Jewish descent.

Club career

Youth career
After playing for Hapoel and Maccabi Petah Tikva, at 2012 moved to Maccabi Haifa youth team. Both in the 2012–13 and the 2013–14 seasons he led the Maccabi Haifa youth team to be champions of the Israeli Youth Premier League and holders of the Israeli Youth State Cup what is called a "Double" (when a team wins both the league and the cup). Maccabi Haifa became in that year the only club in the Israeli History which had managed to win a "Double" two years in a row. In that year Hugi was the top goal scorer of the League with 19 goals.

Senior career
On 17 May 2014, he made hid debut for the senior team, at the 1–1 draw against Hapoel Be'er Sheva at Vasermil Stadium. On 20 June 2014, on loaned to Hapoel Petah Tikva. On 18 October 2014 he scored his debut goal at the senior career, at the 4–1 win against Hapoel Acre. He finish the season with 7 goals at 24 games.

On 1 July 2015 loaned to the urban rival Maccabi Petah Tikva.

International career
Hugi played at the Israel U-19 football team, he was part of the team first increase to 2014 UEFA European Under-19 Championship.

References

External links
 
 

1995 births
Living people
Israeli Jews
Israeli footballers
Maccabi Haifa F.C. players
Hapoel Petah Tikva F.C. players
Maccabi Petah Tikva F.C. players
Hapoel Ra'anana A.F.C. players
Hapoel Tel Aviv F.C. players
SKN St. Pölten players
Wisła Kraków players
Bnei Sakhnin F.C. players
Israeli Premier League players
Austrian Football Bundesliga players
Ekstraklasa players
I liga players
People from Bnei Brak
Footballers from Tel Aviv District
Israel under-21 international footballers
Israel youth international footballers
Association football forwards
Expatriate footballers in Austria
Expatriate footballers in Poland
Israeli expatriate sportspeople in Austria
Israeli expatriate sportspeople in Poland